The Cabinet Manual (previously the Cabinet Office Manual until 2001) is a government document in New Zealand which outlines the main laws, rules and constitutional conventions affecting the operation of the New Zealand Government. It has been described as providing "comprehensive, cohesive and clear advice on a number of key aspects of executive action. It is publicly available, and broadly accepted by a wide range of actors in NZ politics: politicians across the spectrum, officials, academics and the public."

Among its guidelines, the manual gives an overview of the roles of the governor-general, ministers, and the public service; expectations about the conduct of ministers and public servants; Cabinet procedures for decision-making; how a government is formed after an election; how legislation is developed by the government and Parliament; and the protection and use of information held by the government.

Written by the Cabinet Office, the Cabinet Manual is endorsed at the first Cabinet meeting of a new government. It was published most recently in 2017.

Background

New Zealand does not have a single codified constitutional document. The Cabinet Manual forms one part of the constitution of New Zealand, and serves to consolidate many of the previously unwritten conventions through which the New Zealand Government operates.

The first edition was published on 23 January 1979. The idea of such a document was proposed by Prime Minister Sidney Holland about 30 years prior. A foreword by Prime Minister Robert Muldoon in the first edition states:
It is timely that nearly 30 years after the late Sir Sidney Holland issued his directive to the Secretary of the Cabinet all the lore of the Cabinet system should be consolidated. This Manual has done that, and I commend it to Ministers and Departments. It will be useful to them in observing and setting the highest standards for the orderly and efficient conduct of the Government's business.

See also
 Letters Patent Constituting the Office of Governor-General of New Zealand – a royal decree which outlines the role of the governor-general; it is appended to the manual
 Politics of New Zealand
 Cabinet Manual (United Kingdom) – a similar British government document that was modelled on the New Zealand manual

References

External links
 Cabinet Manual – Department of the Prime Minister and Cabinet

Government of New Zealand